Rivka Keren (born 1946) is an Israeli writer.

Biography
Rivka Keren was born as Katalin Friedländer in Debrecen, Hungary. She immigrated with her parents and small brother to Israel in 1957. She has been writing since childhood, first in Hungarian, later in Hebrew. Studied painting in Jerusalem and New York City, philosophy, literature and psychology in Bar Ilan University, graduated in Tel Aviv University (MA, clinical psychology).

Keren has worked as a librarian, art therapist and clinical psychologist. Exhibited her paintings in various countries. During these years, she had published books for children, adolescents, novels, short stories, translations and was included in numerous anthologies. Some of her books and short stories had been translated to German, English, Spanish, Russian, Hungarian, Braille (for the blind) and recorded on disks.

Keren is a member of PEN, ACUM, and IPA.

She is married with two children.

Literary work
Rivka Keren published so far fourteen books and four additional books are due to be published soon. Her work is dealing mostly with subject matters such as destiny, memory, identity, the mystery of love and evil and the dualism of immigrants. Keren's writing is multi-layered and non-linear. The characters wander in a limbo between good and bad, love and hate, sanity and madness, while their state of mind meticulously analyzed. Their quests for belonging, roots and most of all truth and purpose, carry them to their goals through suffering and harsh experiences. Those of the novels that examine the characters against the black hole of the Holocaust were bestsellers and subject to much controversy among critics. In her writings, Rivka Keren, as second generation to Holocaust survivors, is representing the ongoing turmoil and conflict in the existence of immigrants, their pain and alienation but also their absorption and success. Her novels are a study of the human nature, the destructiveness of evil and revenge and the power of hope and love.

List of books
 Outrage, novel, Agam Publishing House, Hanamal series, 2010. (in Hebrew)
 Mortal Love, 2008 (in English)
 Tita and the Satan (Tita ve ha Satan) – novel, Hakibutz Hameuchad, Hasifria Hachadasha Series, Tel Aviv, 1995
 Anatomy of a Revenge (Anatomia shel Nekama) – novel, Am Oved, Sifria Laam Series, Tel Aviv, 1993
 Mortal Love (Ahava Anusha) – novel, Am Oved, Sifria Laam Series, Tel Aviv, 1992
 The Taste of Honey (Ta'am ha Dvash) – novel, Am Oved, Sifria Laam Series, Tel Aviv, 1990
 Sad Summer, Happy Summer (Kaitz Atzuv, Kaitz Meushar) – novel for adolescents, Shoken, Tel Aviv, 1986
 The Story of the Patriarchs (Sipurey ha Avot) – 4 books and audio cassettes for young children, Masada, Tel Aviv, 1982
 Nufar, the Story of a Seagull (Nufar, Sipura shel Schafit Yam) –children's book, Masada, 1981
 The Journey of the Dwarfs Tik and Tak (Hamasa shel Tik ve Tak) – small children's book, Masada, 1980
 Wild Lili (Lili Ha Prua) – diary in letters for adolescents, illustrated by the author, Sifriat Poalim, Tel Aviv, 1978
 Kati, a Young Girl's Diary (Kati, Yomana shel Neara) – biographical novel for adolescents, Am Oved, Tel Aviv, 1973
 Ruthi Shmuti (Ruti Shmuti) – novel + short stories for adolescents, Masada, Tel Aviv, 1970

Translated books
 Katalin – Ungarisches Tagebuch,  Deutsch von Mirjam Pressler, Verlag St. Gabriel, Mödling-Wien, 1996 (Hardcover)
 Katalin, Beltz Verlag, Gulliver Taschenbuch 391, Weinheim und Basel, 1999 (Paperback)
 Bittersüßer Sommer, aus dem Hebräischen von Mirjam Pressler, Gabriel Verlag GmbH, Wien, 1999 (Hardcover)
 Bittersüßer Sommer, Beltz Verlag, Gulliver Taschenbuch 859, Weinheim und Basel, 2001 (Paperback)
 Anatomie einer Rache, aus dem Hebräischen von Helene Seidler, Bleicher Verlag GmbH, Gerlingen, 2001 (Hardcover)
 Der Geschmack von Honig, aus dem Hebräischen von Helene Seidler, Haland&Wirth im Psychosozial-Verlag, Gießen, 2004 (Hardcover)
 Liebe wie der Tod, aus dem Hebräischen von Helene Seidler (Planned to be published)
 Mortal Love, translated from Hebrew by Yael Politis, YWO, UK, 2009

Some of the translated stories
 Rivka Keren, "Aisha", translated from the Hebrew by Maayan Keren, Anthology "Pain and Memory", Editions Bibliotekos Inc., November 2009
 Rivka Keren, "Kiribiri", translated from the Hebrew by Maayan Keren, Anthology "Pain and Memory", Editions Bibliotekos Inc., November 2009
 Rivka Keren, "Islamorada", translated from the Hebrew by Dalit Shmueli, Anthology "Common Boundary", Editions Bibliotekos Inc., June 2010
 Rivka Keren, They Set Sail in the Springtime", excerpt from the novel "Mortal Love", translated from the Hebrew by Yael Politis, Anthology "Common Boundary", Editions Bibliotekos Inc., June 2010
 Rivka Keren "1939", poem translated from the Hebrew by Yael Politis & "Farewell", painting by Rivka Keren, Autumnskypoetry, October 2009, Issue 15.
 Rivka Keren, "Zipora", excerpt from the novel "Mortal Love", translated from the Hebrew by Yael Politis, Anthology "Puzzles of Faith and Patterns of Doubt", Editions Bibliotekos Inc., January 2013

Literary awards
 2000 – The Austrian Government Honorable Award for Youth & Children Literature, Austria
 1995 –  for literature awarded by the Municipality of Holon, Israel
 1986 – Zeev Award for Children Literature, Israel
 1976 – Ramat-Gan Award for Literature, Israel
 1975 – Lamdan Prize for Children and Youth Literature, Israel
 1974 – Nordau Award for Literature, Israel
 1972 – Keren Hayesod Award for Literature, Israel
 1970 – Honorable Mention of the jury of the Yatziv Literary Award, Israel

Additional sources
 Ruth Seif: Review of the novel "Mortal Love" by Rivka Keren. Jewish Book World, Winter Issue 2009, Page 33.
 Helene Conrady, Bilder von Rebecca Keren, "Feine Damen im Olivenhain", NRZ, Zeitung für Düsseldorf, 21 März, 1985
 Jeff Green, "Lost Hungarian Soul", Jerusalem Post Magazine, 4.2.1993
 Jeff Green, "Anatomy of a Revenge", Jerusalem Post, 29.10.1994
 Jeff Green "Tita and the Satan", Jerusalem Post, 22.12.1995
 Hillel Halkin, "The Taste of Honey", The Jerusalem Report Weekly, 6.12.1990
 Philip Harrigan/Jean Etsinger, "Book beat", about St Thomas author and artist from Israel, Rivka Keren, The Daily News, St * Thomas, USVI, November 18, 1987
 Phillip Harrigan, "Sense of Mystery and wistfulness lie in Pictures from Jerusalem", about the art exhibition of Israeli artist Rivka Keren, The Daily News, November 22, 1986
 Ronit Lentin, Israel and the daughters of the Shoah – Reoccupying the Territories of Silence, Berghahn Books, 2000
 Efraim Sicher, The Holocaust Novel (Genres in Context), Routledge, 2005
 "Childhood memories behind Rivka's novel", Jewish Telegraph, Arts and entertainment, Friday, March 13, 2009, page 32

See also
 Mortal Love (novel)

External links
 Homepage of Rivka Keren in the website of The Israeli Institute for the Translation of Hebrew Literature
 Rivka Keren, Islamorada,  translated from the Hebrew by Dalit Shmueli, Words Without Borders, June 2010
 Poems of Rivka Keren
 Rivka Keren in the Lexicon of Modern Hebrew Literature
 Writing in Hebrew, Dreaming in Hungarian: Duality as Destiny - Rivka Keren, Editions Bibliotekos - Brooklyn, N.Y. June 22, 2010
 Rivka Keren “What have I done after all…” Short story (Hebrew)
 Yotam Shwimmer, interview with Rivka Keren, ynet, 09.10.10 (Hebrew)
 Rivka Keren, Hebrew Fiction / Seeing voices, Haaretz, 08.10.10
 Rivka Keren, I Miss Jerusalem, thewriterseye.com, October 4, 2010

1946 births
Israeli Jews
Israeli children's writers
Israeli novelists
Living people
Jewish novelists
Israeli people of Hungarian-Jewish descent
Hungarian Jews
Hebrew-language writers
Israeli women children's writers
Israeli women novelists
Tel Aviv University alumni
Bar-Ilan University alumni
Hungarian emigrants to Israel
20th-century Hungarian women writers
21st-century Hungarian women writers
20th-century Israeli women writers
21st-century Israeli women writers
People from Debrecen
Israeli librarians
Women librarians
Israeli women painters
Israeli painters